Nico Brüngger (born 2 November 1988) is a Swiss cyclist.

Major results
2013
 1st  National Hill-Climb Championships
 7th Overall Oberösterreichrundfahrt
2014
 2nd Züri-Metzgete

References

1988 births
Living people
Swiss male cyclists